Dundalk entered the 1987–88 season as the League Cup holders from 1986–87, having won that competition and finished as runners-up in both league and FAI Cup. 1987–88 was Turlough O'Connor's third season as manager, and was Dundalk's 62nd consecutive season in the top tier of Irish football.

Season summary
The new season opened with the Leinster Senior Cup, with Dundalk exiting in the second round. The League Cup followed and, after qualifying from a four team mini-group to reach the quarter-finals, they were knocked out by St Patrick's Athletic. The 33-round League programme commenced on 13 September 1987, and was completed on 21 April 1988. Shamrock Rovers had won the title for the previous four seasons and were expected to challenge again, while St Patrick's Athletic, Bohemians and Cork City were all strongly tipped. Dundalk went top of the table early, but slumped to fourth after back-to-back defeats in October. They then put together a seven match winning streak, to lead by three points in the run up to Christmas. They continued to lead into March, until a five match winless streak saw them slip to third. 

With three games remaining, the season appeared to swing back in Dundalk's favour when, after going two goals down to Derry City in Oriel Park, they scored three times in the final 13 minutes to win the match. A big win the following week over Bray Wanderers meant that, going into the final match of the season, they only needed a draw against St Patrick's Athletic – their closest challengers – to become Champions. Pats themselves required a win to pip Dundalk to the title. The televised finale, described as being played out in the "emotion charged atmosphere of Oriel Park", ended 1–1. Dundalk had won the League for the first time since 1981–82, and their first title in the Premier Division era. They went on to win the 1988 FAI Cup Final, with a 1–0 victory over Derry City on 1 May 1988 – the club's second League and Cup Double – to cap a season that had seen them play 50 matches.

As FAI Cup runners-up from the season before, they qualified for the 1987–88 European Cup Winners' Cup. In the first round they drew a glamour tie against the holders, Ajax Amsterdam (many of whose players would be in the Dutch squad that would win Euro '88). Despite "gallant" displays, Ajax ran out comfortable winners 6–0 on aggregate.

First-Team Squad (1987–88)
Sources:

a. Includes the Leinster Senior Cup and LFA President's Cup.

Competitions

Leinster Senior Cup
Source:
First Round

Second round

League Cup
Source:
Group

Quarter Final

LFA President's Cup
Source:

Premier Division
Source:

League table

FAI Cup
Source:
First Round

First Round Replay

Second Round

Quarter Final

Quarter Final Replay

Semi Final

Dundalk won 4–0 on aggregate.
Final

Europe

Cup Winners' Cup
First round

Ajax won 6–0 on aggregate.

Awards

Player of the Month

SWAI Personality of the Year

References
Bibliography

Citations

External links
Dundalk F.C. on YouTube

Dundalk F.C. seasons
Dundalk